Arthur Daniel Irawan (born 3 March 1993) is an Indonesian professional footballer who plays as a defensive midfielder or full-back for and captains Liga 1 club Persik Kediri.

Early career 
Arthur started playing football in Jakarta since he was seven years old. He played for Jakarta Intercultural School's varsity soccer team. Spanish club Espanyol became interested in him when he was playing in a 2011 game in England. The Catalonia-based club offered a two-month trial. After impressing in the trial period, Espanyol gave him a four-year contract and an opportunity to train at its youth academy.

Club career

RCD Espanyol B
On November 9, 2011, Irawan officially signed for Espanyol B, which plays in Segunda B, the third-tier of Spanish football. He struggled to earn playtime with eight appearances in three years.

Málaga B
In January 2014, Irawan decided to move to a lower league and sign for Málaga B that plays in the Tercera Division, the fourth-tier of Spanish football, after three years playing for Espanyol B in Segunda B.

Waasland-Beveren 
In the summer of 2014, Irawan joined Belgian first division side Waasland-Beveren. Arthur Irawan finally made his Belgian Pro League debut in their final match of the season. In this game, Waasland lost 1-2 in a home match against KV Mechelen. Injuries prevented him to find another opportunity to play for this club.

Persija Jakarta 
After five years unable to break into the first-team in Europe, Irawan in 2017 returned home to Indonesia and joined Liga 1 (Indonesia) giant Persija Jakarta on a one-year contract. He made his 2017 Liga 1 debut in a match against Bhayangkara F.C that ended with his team winning 1-0. However, like in Europe, he struggled to secure a starting position.

Borneo 
On 18 August 2017, Persija loaned Irawan to Borneo F.C until the end of the season. Irawan made his club debut in a 4–2 win against Persela Lamongan on 19 October 2017 as a substitute for Sultan Samma in the 79th minute. He only played a game for this Samarinda-based club.

Persebaya Surabaya 
Unable to impress Persija, Irawan in 2018 signed with Liga 1 club Persebaya Surabaya. He has been given jersey number 12. He only made one appearance with the club, he made his debut in a 1–1 draw against Persela Lamongan on 30 March 2018.

Badak Lampung 
Like in Europe, he opted to move to a weaker team for the sake of playing time. He joined Badak Lampung, a club that was newly promoted from Liga 2 to play in the 2019 Liga 1 season. Irawan made his first league debut for Badak Lampung as a substitute for Kurniawan Karman in the 78th minute in the Liga 1 in a 0–3 away loss against Bali United on 30 June 2019.

PSS Sleman 
Insisting to stay in top-flight football in Indonesia, Irawan moved to PSS Sleman that won promotion from Liga 2 together with Badak Lampung in 2018 but, unlike the latter, managed to finish in the middle of the table in its inaugural Liga 1 season in 2019.

He made his league debut in a 2–1 away loss against PSM Makassar on 1 March 2020. Finally finding a place where he can shine, Irawan played in all of the club's three matches in the 2020 Liga 1 season that abruptly stopped due to the COVID-19 pandemic.

2021–22 season
On 27 August 2021, 2021–22 Liga 1 officially started, he started his first career in this season by made his debut in a 1–1 draw against Persija Jakarta on 5 September 2021.

Persik Kediri
On 23 November 2021, Irawan signed for Persik. He was signed for the remainder of the 2021-22 Liga 1 season. Irawan made his league debut on 8 January 2022 in a match against Borneo at the Kapten I Wayan Dipta Stadium, Gianyar.

International career 
Irawan was first called to play for Indonesia for the preparation of the AFF Suzuki Cup 2012, which was held in Malaysia. He played against Timor Leste national football team at Gelora Bung Karno Stadium which ended with 1-0 win for Indonesia.

Honours

Club 
PSS Sleman
 Menpora Cup third place: 2021

References

External links 
 
 

1993 births
Living people
Indonesian people of Chinese descent
Indonesian footballers
People from Surabaya
Sportspeople from East Java
Sportspeople from Surabaya
RCD Espanyol B footballers
Atlético Malagueño players
S.K. Beveren players
Persija Jakarta players
Borneo F.C. players
Persebaya Surabaya players
Badak Lampung F.C. players
PSS Sleman players
Persik Kediri players
Segunda División B players
Belgian Pro League players
Liga 1 (Indonesia) players
Indonesian expatriate footballers
Indonesian expatriate sportspeople in Spain
Expatriate footballers in Spain
Indonesian expatriate sportspeople in Belgium
Expatriate footballers in Belgium
Association football defenders
Indonesia international footballers
21st-century Indonesian people